The Saimaa Gesture is a 1981 film by Finnish directors Aki and Mika Kaurismäki. It is a documentary about three Finnish rock groups aboard the steamboat SS Heinävesi on their tour around Lake Saimaa.

The film 
The film was shot from 31 May to 7 June on the 1981 "Tuuliajolla" tour by groups Eppu Normaali, Hassisen Kone and Juice Leskinen Slam. The Saimaa Gesture features artist interviews, more than 20 live performances and several acoustic songs filmed aboard the steamer.

The original title Saimaa-ilmiö is an adaptation of the Finnish translation of the 1979 thriller film The China Syndrome (Finnish: Kiina-ilmiö).

Soundtrack 
The soundtrack album Tuuliajolla was released by Poko Rekords. It was re-released on CD in 1993 and 2007.

References

External links 
 The Saimaa Gesture Aki Kaurismäki Filmography
 Unplugged song from the film YouTube
 

1981 films
Documentary films about rock music and musicians
Finnish documentary films
1980s Finnish-language films
Films shot in Finland
Films directed by Aki Kaurismäki
Films directed by Mika Kaurismäki
1981 documentary films